Liu Peng (born September 1951) is a Chinese Communist Party politician, who most recently served as director of the State General Administration of Sports.

Biography
Born in Chongqing, he studied mechanical engineering at Chongqing University and has a graduate degree from Xi'an Jiaotong University. He was a rusticated youth in Neijiang County during the Cultural Revolution. After the Cultural Revolution ended, he was a factory worker at Chongqing Steel Company. He joined the Communist Party in May 1979. By 1985 he joined the prefecture-level standing committee of Chongqing, then a city under Sichuan province. He was then head of the provincial Communist Youth League organization in Sichuan. In 1991 he became chief commissioner (mayor equivalent) of Yibin. In 1993 he was promoted to the Secretariat of the Communist Youth League, and head of the China Youth Association. In 1997 he became deputy head of the Propaganda Department of the Communist Party of China, and a member of the Central Public Security Comprehensive Management Commission. In April 2002 he became deputy party chief of Sichuan.

In December 2004 he took on the job of the director of the State General Administration of Sports. In February 2005 he was named head of the China Olympic Committee. In 2012, Liu caused controversy by going on a "fishing expedition" in the South China Sea, supposedly going there on a military frigate and returning on a military jet; pictures of Liu in the Spratlys spread on the internet, but was later deleted.

Liu was an alternate member of the 16th Central Committee of the Communist Party of China, and a full member of the 17th and 18th Central Committees.

References

1951 births
Living people
Members of the 17th Central Committee of the Chinese Communist Party
Members of the 18th Central Committee of the Chinese Communist Party
Alternate members of the 16th Central Committee of the Chinese Communist Party
Chongqing University alumni
Xi'an Jiaotong University alumni